Charles Baxter may refer to:

Charles Baxter (actor) (19??–1998), American actor in Love and Pain and the Whole Damn Thing
Charles Baxter (author) (born 1947), American author
Charles Baxter (painter) (1809–1879), English painter
Charles Baxter (politician) (1874–1950), Australian politician
Charles Baxter (rugby union) (born 1981), New Zealand rugby union player
Charles H. Baxter (1841–?), American politician
Charles R. Baxter (1929–2005), American physician
Charles S. Baxter (1866–1927), mayor of Medford, Massachusetts